Roger Jackson may refer to:
Roger Jackson (rower)  (born 1942), Canadian rower
Roger Jackson (defensive back) (born 1959), American football player
Roger Jackson (wide receiver) (born 1989), American football player
Roger L. Jackson (born 1958), American voice actor
Roger Jackson (cricketer) (born 1939), English cricketer